This is a list of a football derbies of the most popular clubs in Dalmatia who play each other:

Dalmatian derby (Hajduk Split vs Šibenik)
Dalmatian derby (Hajduk Split vs Zadar)
Dalmatian derby (Šibenik vs Zadar)
Dalmatian derby (Šibenik vs Zadar, basketball)
Dalmatian derby (Split vs Zadar, basketball)
Split city derby (Derby of St. Duje), between Hajduk and RNK Split